120 Days is the first studio album by 120 Days, released on 10 October 2006 on the Smalltown Supersound label.

The album reached 8th on the VG-lista chart, and netted a Spellemannsprisen award to 120 Days for best rock album of the year. 65 Norwegian music critics voted 120 Days album of the year, ahead of Tom Waits' Orphans: Brawlers, Bawlers & Bastards and Joanna Newsom's Ys.

Track listing

Charts

References

2006 debut albums
120 Days albums
Vice Records albums
Smalltown Supersound albums